The River Clwyd (Welsh: Afon Clwyd) is a river in Wales that rises in the Clocaenog Forest  northwest of Corwen.

It flows due south until, at Melin-y-wig, it veers north-eastwards, tracking the A494 and passing through Derwen, Llanelidan, Pwllglas and Llanfair Dyffryn Clwyd to Ruthin. Here it leaves the relatively narrow valley and enters a broad agricultural vale, the Vale of Clwyd (Welsh: Dyffryn Clwyd). Just south of Denbigh, it is joined by the River Clywedog. This substantial tributary also has its source in the Clocaenog Forest but drains out to the east and north of the forest and passes through Cyffylliog, Bontuchel and Rhewl before its confluence with the main river.

Then the Clwyd meanders northwards through the fertile Clwyd valley to St Asaph. In normal flows at low tide, the waters of these two rivers can be seen flowing side by side down the river with little mixing.

The River Elwy has its source a long way to the west on the flanks of Moel Seisiog south-east of Llanrwst. It also has a tributary the River Aled with its source in the upland lake Llyn Aled. The Elwy flows principally eastwards to join the Clwyd passing through few villages. At the confluence of the Elwy and the Clwyd, the river becomes tidal and enters a narrow estuary with much wildlife before meeting the Irish Sea at Rhyl.

In 1277, King Edward I sited a castle next to the Clwyd at Rhuddlan. In order for his supply barges to reach the castle, he employed 968 men to work on what was called 'The Great Ditch'. He straightened the  stretch of river that ran from the castle to the sea. This was an enormous feat of engineering, compared even to today's modern standards, and it is still possible to make out the original loops and turns of the Clwyd using satellite imagery.

The former county of Clwyd, consisting of the principal areas of modern-day Conwy, Denbighshire, Flintshire and Wrexham, was named after the river, when it was created as a two-tier county in 1974.

The River Clwyd is known for an excellent run of sea trout (sewin), as well as Atlantic Salmon. In recent years including the recent 2017 season there have been good reported catches of wild brown trout most of which are returned unharmed on a voluntary catch and release system. Rhyl and St Asaph Angling Association controls  of fishing on the River Clwyd and its tributaries the River Elwy and River Aled.

See also
Rivers of the United Kingdom

References

Clwyd
Clwyd
Ruthin
Llanelidan